The following is a list of notable deaths in November 2000.

Entries for each day are listed alphabetically by surname. A typical entry lists information in the following sequence:
 Name, age, country of citizenship at birth, subsequent country of citizenship (if applicable), reason for notability, cause of death (if known), and reference.

November 2000

1
George Armstrong, 56, English football player and coach, brain haemorrhage.
Sally Elizabeth Carlson, 104, American mathematician.
David Crook, 90, British-Chinese communist activist and spy.
Bernard Erhard, 66, American actor.
Steve Evans, 58, American motorsports broadcaster.
Platon Kornyljak, 80, Ukrainian-born German Greek-Catholic hierarch.
Ruth I. Michler, 33, American-born German mathematician, traffic accident.
Steven Runciman, 97, English historian.

2
Eddie Collins Jr., 83, American baseball player.
Robert Cormier, 75, American author and journalist,, complications from a blood clot.
Michael Herman, 57, French American mathematician.
Eva Morris, 114, British supercentenarian, oldest person in the world.
Sue Ryder, 76, British charity founder.

3
Bob Bryant, 82, American football player.
Charles F. Hockett, 84, American linguist.
Robert Sherlaw Johnson, 68, British composer and musicologist.
Shaheed Aga Syed Mehdi, 41, Indian Shia leader and social activist, assassinated.
George Vandeman, 84, American evangelist and broadcaster.
Mary Hunter Wolf, American theatre director and producer.

4
Vernel Fournier, 72, American jazz drummer, cerebral hemorrhage.
John Reynolds, 77, American physicist.
Ian Sneddon, 80, Scottish mathematician.
Stephanie Lawrence, 50, British singer and actress

5
Etienne Aigner, 95, Austrian-born American fashion designer.
David Brower, 88, American environmentalist.
Jimmie Davis, 101, American singer, songwriter and politician (Governor of Louisiana).
Petar Dertliev, 84, Bulgarian politician.
Victor Grinich, 75, American pioneer in the semiconductor industry, prostate cancer.
Amalia Hernández, 83, Mexican ballet choreographer.
Willard Marshall, 79, American baseball player.
Roger Peyrefitte, 93, French writer and diplomat.
Mary Sinclair, 77, American actress.
Harry Taylor, 81, American baseball player.

6
Torgny Anderberg, 81, Swedish actor and film director.
Eddy Bruma, 75, Surinamese politician, lawyer and writer, injuries sustained during robbery.
Herbert Brün, 82, German composer and pioneer of electronic and computer music.
L. Sprague de Camp, 92, American writer.
John McPhail, 76, Scottish football player.
Stefaniya Stanyuta, 95, Belarus/Soviet theater and movie actress.

7
Hal Fowler, 73, American poker player, hemorrhagic shock.
George W. Gibbs Jr., 84, American civil rights leader.
Jim Hutchinson, 103, English cricketer and centenarian.
Ingrid of Sweden, 90, Queen consort of Frederick IX of Denmark.
Nimalan Soundaranayagam, 50, Sri Lankan Tamil teacher and politician, assassinated.
Chidambaram Subramaniam, 90, Indian politician and independence activist.
Kōzaburō Yoshimura, 89, Japanese film director.
Boris Zakhoder, 82, Russian poet and children's writer.

8
Elio Crovetto, 73, Italian actor and comedian.
John Levitow, 55, US Air Force loadmaster and recipient of the Medal of Honor, cancer.
Marc Lifschey, 74, American oboist, bone marrow disorder.
Dick Morrissey, 60, British jazz musician and composer, cancer.
Faris Odeh, 14, Palestinian boy  demonstrator, shot  by the Israel Defense Forces.
Józef Pińkowski, 71, Prime Minister of Poland.
Svetlana Kana Radević, 62, Montenegrin architect.
Jan van der Vaart, 69, Dutch ceramist.

9
Chiyonosuke Azuma, 74, Japanese actor and dancer.
Michel Demaret, 60, Belgian politician.
Sherwood Johnston, 73, American racing driver.
James B. Knighten, 80, African-Americans US Army Air Corps pilot.
Eric Morley, 82, British TV host.
Eddy Nawgu, Nigerian self-proclaimed "prophet of God" and occult practitioner.
Hugh Paddick, 85, English actor (BBC radio show Round the Horne).
Kevin Shegog, 67, Australian country music singer, complications of a stroke.

10
Adamantios Androutsopoulos, 81, Greek lawyer and politician, Prime Minister (1973-1974).
Jacques Chaban-Delmas, 85, French Gaullist politician and Prime Minister of France.
Bob Matthewson, 70, English footballer and referee.
Walter P. McConaughy, 92, American diplomat and ambassador.
Alan Tyson, 74, British musicologist.
Dawn-Marie Wesley, 14, Canadian bullying victim, suicide by hanging.

11
Rayford Barnes, 80, American actor.
Sir Alun Davies, 87, Welsh public servant.
William Harris, 6th Earl of Malmesbury, 92, British aristocrat and Lord Lieutenant of Hampshire.
Hugo Pos, 86, Surinamese judge, writer, and poet.

 Notable people killed in the Kaprun disaster
Michael Goodridge, 36, United States Army Major, 
Josef Schaupper, 37, Austrian deaf alpine skier.
Sandra Schmitt, 19, German freestyle skier.

12
John Bury, 75, British set designer, costume designer and lighting designer.
Christo Coetzee, 71, South African  avant-garde artist.
Wim Cohen, 77, Dutch mathematician.
Eugene Antonio Marino, 66, American Roman Catholic prelate.
Franck Pourcel, 87, French composer, arranger, and conductor.
Leah Rabin, 72, wife of Israeli Prime Minister Yitzhak Rabin.
Harold Walker, 82, English cricketer.
Sigi Ziering, 72, German-American scientist, playwright and philanthropist.

13
Ralph Bingham Cloward, 92, American neurosurgeon.
Gheorghe Ghimpu, 63, Romanian politician and political prisoner, traffic accident.
Audrey Stubbart, 105, American centenarian.
Jim Wise, 81, American musical composer.

14
Len Gabrielson, 85, American baseball player.
Pietro Rimoldi, 89, Italian cyclist.
Libby Scheier, 54, Canadian poet and short story writer, breast cancer.
Robert Trout, 91, American broadcast news reporter.

15
Ju-Chin Chu, 80, Chinese American chemical engineer.
G. V. Desani, 91, British-Indian novelist, poet, and social commentator.
Harald Fischer, 68, German chiropractor and charity worker in Palestine, Israeli missile attack.
Bernard Gadney, 91, English rugby player.
Oscar Kempthorne, 81, British statistician and geneticist.
Ranjit Maharaj, 87, Indian spiritual teacher.
Rinaldo Martino, 79, Italian Argentine soccer player.
Harry Webb, 92, Australian politician).
Simon Wigg, 40, English speedway rider, brain tumour.

16
Russ Conway, 75, English popular music pianist.
Josef Ertl, 75, German politician, complications from severe burn injuries.
Joe C., 26, American rapper, hype man and musician, complications from celiac disease.
Ahmet Kaya, 43, Turkish folk singer, heart attack.
DJ Screw, 29, American DJ and rapper, codeine overdose.
Hosea Williams, 74, American civil rights leader, activist, scientist, and politician, cancer.

17
Paul W. Brown, 85, American lawyer.
Edith DeVoe, 79, American nurse, lung cancer.
Francis Jennings, American historian.
Louis Néel, 95, French physicist.
Bim Sherman, 50, Jamaican musician.

18
Jaap van der Leck, 89, Dutch football manager.
Hubert Miller, 82, American bobsledder.
Emin Sabitoglu, 63, Azerbaijani film music composer.
Ilya Starinov, 100, Soviet military officer.

19
George Cosmas Adyebo, 53, Ugandan politician and economist, cancer.
Jeaffreson Greswell, 84, British Royal Air Force officer.
Max Hooper, 74, Australian politician.
Charles Ruff, 61, American lawyer, heart attack.
James Russell Wiggins, 96, United States Ambassador to the United Nations.
Jane Shaw, 89, Scottish children's author.

20
Morris Barry, 82, British television producer.
Carolyn Craven, 55, American journalist.
Nikolay Dollezhal, 101, Czech-Soviet nuclear physicist.
Vyacheslav Kotyonochkin, 73, Soviet/Russian animation director, animator and artist.
Mike Muuss, 42, American computer programmer (computer network administration software utility Ping).
Bryce Poe II, 76, American Air Force general, stroke.

21
Sir Cyril Clarke, 93, British physician, geneticist and entomologist.
Zygmunt Gadecki, 62, Polish footballer.
Joe Gasparella, 73, American football player.
Hans-Wilhelm Koepcke, 86, German zoologist, ornithologist, and herpetologist.
Ernest Lluch, 63, Spanish economist and politician, assassinated by ETA.

22
Carlos Cardoso, Mozambican journalist.
Jack Dyson, 66, British cricketer and footballer.
Alick Jeffrey, 61, English footballer.
Christian Marquand, 73, French director, actor and screenwriter.
Naresh Mehta, 78, Indian writer.
Théodore Monod, 98, French naturalist, explorer, and humanist.
Emil Zátopek, 78, Czechoslovakian runner and Olympic champion.

23
Florence Bell, 87, British scientist.
Elma Mitchell, 81, British poet.
Bobby Sheen, 59, American rhythm and blues singer, pneumonia.
Rayner Unwin, 74, British publisher.
Bernard Vorhaus, 95, American film director.
Conrad Voss Bark, 87, British writer and journalist.

24
Félix Erviti Barcelona, 90, Spanish Roman Catholic priest.
Carla Capponi, 81, Italian partisan and politician.
Mel Lindquist, 89, American engineer.
Paul Lyneham, 55, Australian journalist and television presenter, lung cancer.
Harley Warrick, 76, American barn painter, aneurysm.
Mohammad Aslam Watanjar, Afghan general and politician.

25
Hugh Alexander, 83, American professional baseball player and scout.
Canito, 44, Spanish footballer.
Frederick Cass, 87, Canadian politician.
James Deetz, 70, American anthropologist.
Mario Giacomelli, 75, Italian photographer and photojournalist.
Sir Florizel Glasspole, 91, Jamaican Governor-General.
Austin Rawlinson, 98, British swimmer.
Gerd Vespermann, 74, German actor.
Montse Watkins, 45, Spanish fiction writer and essayist, and journalist, cancer.

26
James Murdoch Austin, 85, New Zealand-American meteorologist.
Ralph Bates, 101, British novelist.
Gianfranco Ciaurro, 71, Italian politician.
Doug Domokos, 44, American stunt motorcyclist, ultralight aircraft accident.
Paddy Donegan, 77, Irish politician.
Zentaro Kosaka, 88, Japanese politician, renal failure.
Carlo Simi, 76, Italian set-/costume designer and architect.

27
Anne Barton, 76, American actress.
Sir Malcolm Bradbury, 68, British author and literary critic.
Clara Chiano, 79, American professional baseball player (All-American Girls Professional Baseball League).
Willie Cunningham, 75, Scottish footballer.
Len Shackleton, 78, English footballer ("Clown Prince of Soccer").
Dorothy Woolfolk, 87, American comic-book editor.

28
Gregg Barton, 88, American actor.
Robert Bentley, 93, American animator.
Carol Bolt, 59, Canadian playwright, liver cancer.
Henry B. González, 84, American Democratic politician (House of Representatives member from Texas from 1961 to 1999).
Liane Haid, 105, Austrian actress.
René Maltête, 70, French photographer and poet.
Heinrich Schmidt, 88, German nazi physician.
Anatole Boris Volkov, 76, American physicist and spy, cancer.

29
Marvel Cooke, 97, American journalist, writer, and civil rights activist, leukemia.
Margaret Early, 80, American film actress.
Lee Fogolin Sr., 73, Canadian ice hockey player (Detroit Red Wings, Chicago Black Hawks).
Lou Groza, 76, American football player (Cleveland Browns) and member of the Pro Football Hall of Fame.
Sir William Henderson, 87, Scottish veterinarian.
Gwen Grant Mellon, 89, American medical missionary.
Ilmar Laaban, 78, Estonian poet and publicist.

30
Lady Elizabeth Basset, 92, English author and courtier.
Olga Bogaevskaya, 85, Russian Soviet painter and graphic artist.
Kiyotaka Katsuta, 52, Japanese serial killer and thief, execution by hanging.
Ansumane Mané, Bissau-Guinean soldier and rebel, assassinated.
Eloise Jarvis McGraw, 84, American author.
Ted Scruggs, 77, American football player.
Scott Smith, 45, Canadian bassist (Loverboy), drowned.

References 

2000-11
 11